Francisco Pérez (born 4 February 1934) is a former Uruguayan cyclist. He competed in the individual road race and team time trial events at the 1964 Summer Olympics.

References

External links
 

1934 births
Living people
Uruguayan male cyclists
Olympic cyclists of Uruguay
Cyclists at the 1964 Summer Olympics
Place of birth missing (living people)